{{DISPLAYTITLE:Tau1 Serpentis}}

Tau1 Serpentis, Latinized from τ1 Serpentis, is a single star in the Caput (Head) segment of the equatorial constellation of Serpens. It is a red hued star that is dimly visible to the naked eye with an apparent visual magnitude of 5.16. Based upon parallax measurements, this star is located at a distance of approximately 990 light years from the Sun, while it is drifting closer with a radial velocity of −16.5 km/s.

This object is an aging red giant star, currently on the asymptotic giant branch, with a stellar classification of M1III. Having exhausted the supply of hydrogen at its core, it has cooled and expanded until  it now has around 99 times the girth of the Sun. It is a suspected variable star with a brightness that has been measured varying from magnitude 5.13 down to 5.20. The Hipparcos data for Tau1 Serpentis shows brightness variations with a period of 6.4675 days, and an amplitude of 0.0066 magnitudes. The star is radiating 2,158 times the luminosity of the Sun from its swollen photosphere at an effective temperature of 3,954 K.

References

M-type giants
Asymptotic-giant-branch stars
Suspected variables

Serpens (constellation)
Serpentis, Tau1
BD+15 2858
Serpentis, 09
137471
075530
5739